The Ancestor's Tale: A Pilgrimage to the Dawn of Life is a science book by Richard Dawkins and Yan Wong on the subject of evolution, which follows the path of humans backwards through evolutionary history, describing some of humanity's cousins as they converge on their common ancestors. The book was first published in 2004 and substantially updated in 2016. It was nominated for the 2005 Aventis Prize for Science Books.

Synopsis
The book takes a different path backwards through evolution and meets different groupings of organisms. The authors use backward chronology instead of a forward chronology as a way of celebrating the unity of life. In a backward chronology, the ancestors of any set of species must eventually meet at a particular moment. The last common ancestor is the one that they all share which the authors call a "concestor". The oldest concestor is the ancestor of all surviving life forms on this planet.  The evidence for this is that all organisms share the same genetic code and was not invented twice. There is no sign of other independent origins of life, and if new ones would now arise, they would probably be eaten.
This book is a pilgrimage to discover our ancestors and meet other pilgrims (organisms) who join as the book reaches a common ancestor that man shares with them. The reader reads of 40 rendezvous before hitting the origin of life itself.

The book's structure is inspired by Geoffrey Chaucer's late-14th century work The Canterbury Tales and its pilgrims. For instance, how new species come about, how the axolotl never needs to mature, how hard it is to classify animals, and why our fish-like ancestors moved to the land.

Concestors
The authors use the term concestor, coined by Nicky Warren, for the most recent common ancestor at each rendezvous point. At each rendezvous point, we meet the concestor of ourselves and the listed species or collection of species. The concestor does not have to have been much like those creatures. After the "rendezvous", our fellow "pilgrims" have had as much time to evolve and change as we have.  Along the way, the authors introduce new pilgrims who join us on the trip backwards through time.

Chapters

Prologue

Primates

Non-primate mammals

Non-mammal chordates

Non-chordate animals

From the lancelets onward, the authors provide dates under duress stating that "dating becomes so difficult and controversial that my courage fails me".

Non-animal eukaryotes 

There are essential differences between the 1st and 2nd editions of the book in this section. Another rendezvous has been added (#33), and the unknown rendezvous has been partially resolved.

Great Historic Rendezvous
This is a significantly shorter section in the second edition.  The authors describe the critical beginnings of eukaryotic cells and describe the endosymbiotic theory proposed by Lynn Margulis.

Prokaryotes 
Prokaryotes can move genetic material between unicellular and multicellular organisms other than by the ("vertical") transmission of DNA from parent to offspring by way of Horizontal gene transfer.

Origin of life
The authors elaborate at length about the possible origins of life through RNA world, Enterobacteria phage Qbeta, Miller–Urey experiment, Spiegelman's Monster and the possible hypercycle of DNA, RNA, and enzymes which work together to support each other in a primordial world.

Reception
Carl Zimmer of the New York Times stated that the book is one of the best to understand evolutionary trees.

The Guardian thought it was awkward to move backward in time starting from humans and required linguistic gymnastics with new definitions of before and after a certain evolutionary point. Matt Ridley at The Guardian liked the approach of a  Chaucer Pilgrim traveling backwards and the perspective of not seeing other animals as failures.

Translations

See also
 Evolutionary history of life
 Phylogenetic tree
 Timeline of evolution
 Timeline of human evolution

References

External links
 Video introduction by Richard Dawkins
 Richard Dawkins talks to Ira Flatow on "Science Friday"
 Family and kid's experiential programs based on Ancestors Tale, by Connie Barlow, with video, slides and scripts.
 OneZoom, an interactive fractal explorer of the tree of life, used to make the visualizations in The Ancestor's Tale.

2004 non-fiction books
2004 in biology
2016 in biology
2016 non-fiction books
Biological evolution
Biology books
Books about evolution
Books by Richard Dawkins
English-language books
English non-fiction books
Houghton Mifflin books
Human evolution books
Last common ancestors
Weidenfeld & Nicolson books
Roc (mythology)